A b-girl is a female breakdancer.

B-girl may also refer to:

 A bargirl
B-Girl (film), a 2009 dance film written and directed by Emily Dell

See also
The 'B' Girls, a Canadian musical group